Mats Wilander successfully defended his title, by defeating Anders Järryd 6–1, 6–2 in the final.

Seeds

Draw

Finals

Top half

Bottom half

References

External links
 Official results archive (WTA)
 Official results archive (ITF)

Men's Singles
Singles